Joe Ferguson (born 3 May, 2000) is a British sprinter from Yorkshire.

Ferguson started running in Yorkshire for Barnsley AC in 2013, before running for Leeds City.

At the British Athletics Championships in September 2020, held in Manchester, Ferguson won bronze in the 200 metres. At the 2022 World Championship trials Ferguson ran a personal best time of 20.23 to qualify for the 2022 World Athletics Championships. At the games themselves, running in the 200 metres, Ferguson qualified from the heats to make the semi-finals.

References

2000 births
Living people
British male sprinters
English male sprinters
World Athletics Championships athletes for Great Britain
21st-century British people